This is a list of all personnel changes for the 2009 NBA off-season and 2009–10 NBA season.

Retirement

Front office movements

Head coach changes

Legend:
Strike = fired or will not return for the 2009–10 season
Boldface =  New head coach
Bold italics = Interim coach who was promoted to head coach

General manager changes

Legend:
Strike = fired or did not have contract renewed
Boldface = New General Manager

Player movement
The following is a list of player movement via free agency and trades.

Trades

Signed from free agency

10-day contracts

Released

Waived

Renounced
Detroit Pistons
Allen Iverson (to Grizzlies)
Antonio McDyess (to Spurs)
Wálter Herrmann
Memphis Grizzlies 
Chris Mihm
Darius Miles
Mike Wilks
Juan Carlos Navarro
Portland Trail Blazers
Raef LaFrentz
Shavlik Randolph (to Heat)
Michael Ruffin

Training camp cuts
All players here did not make the final roster

Going overseas

NBA Draft

The 2009 NBA Draft was held on June 25, 2009 in New York City at Madison Square Garden.

Lottery selections

Undrafted free agent signings

References
General

Specific

Transactions
2009-10